Othonna purpurascens is a species of plant endemic to South Africa.

Description 
This plant has a scrubby succulent stem. The leaves are flat and fleshy. They are smooth and covered with a whitish bloom, but the lower parts of the stems have woolly scars from dropping leaves. The two headed flowers are purplish in colour and the seeds that they produce are silky.

Distribution and habitat 
This species is known from Mastenberg in South Africa.

References 

purpurascens
Fauna of South Africa
Plants described in 1865